Kennedy's syndrome may mean:

Foster Kennedy syndrome
 Kennedy's disease, a U.S. name for spinal and bulbar muscular atrophy